The following is a list of the monastic houses in Derbyshire, England.

The following location in Derbyshire lacks monastic connection:

Beightonfields Priory: a 17th- to 19th-century country house

See also
 List of monastic houses in England

Notes

References

Bibliography

History of Derbyshire
England in the High Middle Ages
Medieval sites in England
.Monastic
.
.Monastic
Derbyshire
Derbyshire
.
Lists of buildings and structures in Derbyshire